Torsvåg is a fishing village on the far northwestern coast of Vannøya island in Karlsøy Municipality in Troms og Finnmark county, Norway. There is much archeological evidence that show that there has been settlements in Torsvåg since the Stone Age.

The village of Torsvåg includes a village area on the island of Vannøya and also an area on the islet of Kåja, located just offshore.  There is a causeway connecting the two places which forms a nice harbor surrounded by the fishing village.  The breakwaters at the entrance to the harbor form a snug port at the threshold of the big seas. The Vanna fish processing plant, «Torsvågbruket», is located on Kåja island and Torsvåg Lighthouse is on the highest point of the island.  Today, Torsvåg only has between 10 and 20 inhabitants, but earlier in its history this fishing village often had hundreds of residents.

Climate

References

Karlsøy
Villages in Troms